Eupterote splendens is a moth in the family Eupterotidae. It was described by Wolfgang A. Nässig and Christian H. Schulze in 2007. It is found in Sulawesi, Indonesia.

References

Moths described in 2007
Eupterotinae